is a Japanese dating sim by Shoeisha, released on March 14, 1997, for Windows 95 in Japan. A  PlayStation, and Sega Saturn version were soon released as well. It is a female ninja dating sim, as well as a gal game. It is said that the lesbian elements appear to be stronger in the PlayStation version.

Plot
There is a world where shinobi (ninja and kunoichi) are recognized. The story centers around Kaede, who enters Princess Yuri School（姫百合学園 Hime Yuri Gakuen）and offers assistance to three girls for one year, who happen to be guardians. The top graduate is given a special privilege to become a freelance Shinobi. After entering, Kaede strives to serve a favorite person for one year.

Gameplay
There are eight different kinds of class subjects based on (忍術) Ninjutsu

①Language Studies（語学）
②Arithmetic（算術）
③Pharmacy（薬学）
④Medicine（医術）
⑤Jujutsu（体術）
⑥Manners（作法）
⑦Art of Concealment and Espionage studies（忍術学）
⑧Art of Concealment and Espionage practical skill（忍術実技）

There are 13 different endings in all. It is known that in the best ending, Kaede can marry Tsukiha.

Main characters
 　(Voiced by: Shiho Kikuchi)
As the main character, she is a daughter of the Hagakure family head. She is the type of person who is often liked very well by others. She served the Hisano at the age of 8, and lived with Tsukiha for many years. Kaede holds goodwill towards Tsukiha, and works closely with her and the other two bodyguards Kasumi, and Miyuki.

 　(Voiced by: Sakura Tange)
One of the 3 guards. Kaede's childhood friend who is a hot spring enthusiast. She holds kind feelings toward Kaede very much, because when she was young, Kaede helped her develop and mature as a person.

 　(Voiced by: Ai Orikasa)
As one of the 3 guards, her reason for entering the school is unknown. She has tomboyish demeanor, and prefers to dress like a man. She is taciturn, and doesn't care to be close with anyone. She is popular with the other schoolgirls.

 　(Voiced by: Kikuko Inoue)
Also one of the 3 guards. She is always sleepy, and seems to be at her happiest while asleep. She is popular with boys of other schools and often receives love letters. She is proud of her cooking skills, and enjoys housework.

 　(Voiced by: Haruna Ikezawa)
As a classmate, she likes Miyuki, and guards Miyuki whenever Kaede appears to be busy. However, she deeply regards Kaede as her rival.

 　(Voiced by: Emi Shinohara)
Classmate. She is a popular person in the school, due to her bright character. She tends to find school life very boring, and works part-time as a waitress. She falls in love with Juzen at first sight.

 　(Voiced by: Kyoko Hikami)
Another classmate with a very earnest personality. As the chairperson of the class works, she harbors kind feelings toward Kasumi, who is sexless. She is very skilled in arithmetic.

 　(Voiced by: Akio Ōtsuka )
Kaede's father, who happens to be the person holding the key to this story.

 　(Voiced by: Kenyū Horiuchi)
 An American, who happens to be Miyuki's father. Johnny is a mysterious ninja who appears when duties are completed.

Music
Opening theme song 『 Omoi no Hate (想いの果て)』 by Shiho Kikuchi
Ending theme song 『 Korekara Zutto... (これからずっと...)』 by Sakura Tange

Trivia
In Japan, "Kunoichi" means a female ninja.

External links
あやかし忍伝くの一番introduction

1997 video games
Bishōjo games
Dating sims
Fictional lesbians
Japan-exclusive video games
Video games about ninja
PlayStation (console) games
Romance video games
School-themed video games
Sega Saturn games
Video games developed in Japan
Video games featuring female protagonists
Windows games